The Future of the Race is a 1996 book by prominent African-American scholars Henry Louis Gates and Cornel West. It is both commentary and criticism on W. E. B. Du Bois' essay "The Talented Tenth" . The Vintage Books edition includes the original text by Du Bois.

Bibliography

1996 non-fiction books
African-American culture
Books by Cornel West